Yezhovka is a rural locality (a khutor) and the administrative center of Yezhovskoye Rural Settlement, Kikvidzensky District, Volgograd Oblast, Russia. The population was 824 as of 2010. There are 7 streets.

Geography 
Yezhovka is located in steppe, on Khopyorsko-Buzulukskaya plain, on the right bank of the Machekha River, 39 km northeast of Preobrazhenskaya (the district's administrative centre) by road. Mikhaylovka is the nearest rural locality.

References 

Rural localities in Kikvidzensky District